Holec is a surname. Notable people with the surname include:

 Dominik Holec (born 1994), Slovak footballer
 Miroslav Holec (born 1987), Czech ice hockey forward
 Josif Holec (1835–1898), Serbian military doctor
 Wilhelm Holec (1914–1944), Austrian footballer

See also
 

Czech-language surnames